5119 Imbrius, provisional designation: , is a Jupiter trojan from the Trojan camp, approximately  in diameter. It was discovered on 8 September 1988 by Danish astronomer Poul Jensen at the Brorfelde Observatory near Holbæk, Denmark. The dark Jovian asteroid has a rotation period of 12.8 hours. It was numbered in March 1992, and named from Greek mythology after Imbrius, who was killed by Greek archer Teucer during the Trojan War.

Discovery 

A first precovery was taken at Palomar Observatory in December 1954, extending the asteroid's observation arc by 34 years prior to its discovery.

Orbit and classification 

Imbrius is a dark Jovian asteroid in a 1:1 orbital resonance with Jupiter. It is located in the trailering Trojan camp at the Gas Giant's  Lagrangian point, 60° behind its orbit . It is also a non-family asteroid of the Jovian background population. It orbits the Sun at a distance of 4.6–5.8 AU once every 11 years and 10 months (4,333 days; semi-major axis of 5.2 AU). Its orbit has an eccentricity of 0.11 and an inclination of 16° with respect to the ecliptic.

Numbering and naming 

This minor planet was numbered on 18 March 1992. On 29 November 2021, IAU's Working Group Small Body Nomenclature  it from Greek mythology after Imbrius, son of Mentor and husband of King Priam's daughter Medesicaste. Imbrius was killed by the Greek archer Teucer during the Trojan War.

Physical characteristics 

Imbrius is an assumed, carbonaceous C-type asteroid, while most larger Jupiter trojans are D-types. It has a typical V–I color index of 0.97.

Lightcurve 

In February 1994, Imbrius was observed by Stefano Mottola and Anders Erikson at La Silla Observatory in Chile, using the ESO 1-metre telescope and its DLR MkII CCD-camera. The photometric observations were used to build a lightcurve showing a rotation period of  hours with a brightness variation of  magnitude.

Diameter and albedo 

According to the survey carried out by NASA's Wide-field Infrared Survey Explorer with its subsequent NEOWISE mission, the Trojan asteroid measures 49.25 kilometers in diameter and its surface has a low albedo of 0.061, while the Collaborative Asteroid Lightcurve Link assumes a standard albedo for carbonaceous asteroid of 0.057 and calculates a diameter of 48.48 kilometers based on an absolute magnitude of 10.3.

References

External links 
 Asteroid Lightcurve Database (LCDB), query form (info )
 Dictionary of Minor Planet Names, Google books
 Discovery Circumstances: Numbered Minor Planets (5001)-(10000) – Minor Planet Center
 
 

005119
Discoveries by Poul Jensen (astronomer)
Named minor planets
19880908